Albany Ward may refer to:

 Albany Ward – Hannam Edward Albany Ward (1879–1966), pioneer English theatre proprietor and cinema developer
 Albany Ward (local government) – a ward of Auckland Council, New Zealand